Holger Rasmusen (April 26, 1894 – November 2, 1983) was an American politician and pharmacist.

Born in Superior, Wisconsin, Rasmusen served in the United States Navy during World War I and received his doctorate from Drake University. Rasmusen was a pharmacist in Spooner, Wisconsin and served as mayor from 1942 to 1948. He then served in the Wisconsin State Assembly from 1949 to 1953 as a Republican. Rasmusen finally served in the Wisconsin State Senate from 1957 to 1972. He died in Spooner, Wisconsin.

Notes

1894 births
1983 deaths
Politicians from Superior, Wisconsin
People from Spooner, Wisconsin
Military personnel from Wisconsin
Drake University alumni
Mayors of places in Wisconsin
Republican Party members of the Wisconsin State Assembly
Republican Party Wisconsin state senators
20th-century American politicians